Iva imbricata is a North American species of flowering plant in the family Asteraceae known by the common names dune marsh-elder and seacoast marsh elder. It is native to Cuba, the Bahamas, and coastal areas of the United States from Texas to Virginia. It is a low shrub, found on sand dunes and the upper beach. It is a highly salt tolerant plant, and is often the perennial plant closest to the ocean.

Iva imbricata is an important species for dune stabilization and can easily be propagated by cuttings. It sometimes grows up to 100 cm (40 inches) tall. It produces numerous flower heads in elongated arrays, each head with 2-17 disc flowers but no ray flowers.

References

External links
Iva imbricata at Carolina Nature.
Atlas of Florida Vascular Plants
Alabama Plant Atlas

imbricata
Flora of the United States
Flora of Cuba
Flora of the Bahamas
Plants described in 1788
Flora without expected TNC conservation status